Eva de Maizière ( Werner; 27 March 1915, in Hanover – October 2003, in Bonn) was a German artist, sculptor and cellist. She was married to Ulrich de Maizière until her death in 2003. Her sons are Andreas and Thomas de Maizière, both politicians.

Further reading 
 Andreas Schumann: Familie de Maizière – Eine deutsche Geschichte. Orell Füssli, Zürich 2014, .

References 

German women sculptors
1915 births
2003 deaths
German women painters
Artists from Hanover
20th-century German sculptors
20th-century German painters
20th-century German women artists